Gibbaeum is a genus of about 21 species of small succulent plants of the family Aizoaceae, indigenous to the Little Karoo region of South Africa. 
The name "Gibbaeum" comes from the Latin gibbosus (hunchback)

Description

These dwarf succulents are characterized by distinctively asymmetrical pairs of leaves, mostly globular or sometimes thick and arcuate. The sizes of the leaves of each pair are nearly always different. Gibbaeums grow in clumps and produce pink or white flowers in spring.

Distribution
Genus Gibbaeum is predominantly indigenous to the Little Karoo region of the Western Cape Province, South Africa. A few species extend outside of this region. Three species extend north into the Great Karoo region: Gibbaeum gibbosum, Gibbaeum heathii and Gibbaeum nuciforme. Two extend south into the Overberg region: Gibbaeum esterhuyseniae and Gibbaeum hartmannianum.

Cultivation
Sunny exposure and well drained soil. Their natural range spans the boundary between winter and summer rainfall areas of southern Africa, and their growth period (emergence of new leaves and flowering) is therefore in summer for some species and in winter for other ones. However, overall most species can be watered primarily in winter. Temperature must stay above 10 °C in winter.

Propagation can be done by cuttings or by seeds. Many of the species hybridise easily - with each other and with the related genus Muiria.

List of species
 Gibbaeum album
 Gibbaeum angulipes
 Gibbaeum blackburniae
 Gibbaeum comptonii
 Gibbaeum dispar
 Gibbaeum esterhuyseniae
 Gibbaeum geminum
 Gibbaeum gibbosum
 Gibbaeum hartmannianum
 Gibbaeum heathii
 Gibbaeum luckhofii
 Gibbaeum nebrownii
 Gibbaeum nuciforme
 Gibbaeum pachypodium
 Gibbaeum petrense
 Gibbaeum pilosulum
 Gibbaeum pubescens
 Gibbaeum schwantesii
 Gibbaeum velutinum

References

External links
 
 

 
Aizoaceae genera
Taxa named by N. E. Brown
Taxa named by Adrian Hardy Haworth